Lauder is a small community in the Rural Municipality of Grassland in the Canadian province of Manitoba. The community is located at the junction of Highway 254 and Highway 345, approximately 100 km south-west of Brandon only 22 km south-west of the Town of Hartney. Lauder is about 3 miles south of the Souris River and the Lauder Sand Hills. 

Lauder was established in 1891 by the Canadian Pacific Railway and named after Archdeacon John Strutt Lauder, rector of Christ Church in Ottawa. The first survey laid out blocks 1-3 then in 1903, the CPR surveyors laid out blocks 4-7. About the only type of business the town didn't have in its long history was a fire department. The first of several devastating fires was "the great fire of 1894". 125 years after its establishment, there is only one business left in town and most of the buildings are gone but the community spirit is strong.

Infrastructure
Lauder is served by the Canadian Pacific Railway, as well Manitoba Highways 254 & 345.

Attractions
 Lauder Sand Hills

Notable people
Robert Fulton Logan (1889-1959), a painter, illustrator, and specialist in copper etchings.
Gordon G. Phillips (1927-1992), helped design and build the Alouette communication satellites. In 1965 he went to work in the Canadian Patent Office.

See also
 List of communities in Manitoba

References

External links
 Lauder Community Profile Town of Hartney

Unincorporated communities in Westman Region
Ghost towns in Manitoba